Joseph Horowitz (born 1948 in New York City) is an American cultural historian whose eleven books mainly deal with the institutional history of classical music in the United States. As a producer of concerts, he has played a pioneering role in promoting thematic programming and new concert formats. His tenure as artistic advisor and, subsequently, executive director of the Brooklyn Philharmonic at the Brooklyn Academy of Music (1992–1997) attracted national attention for its radical departure from traditional functions and templates. He currently produces "More than Music" documentaries for National Public Radio.

Life and work
Horowitz’s books treat the late nineteenth century as the apex of American classical music, before it generated into a “culture of performance“ spotlighting celebrity conductors and instrumentalists, whom he terms “performance specialists” in contradistinction to the composer/performers of an earlier era. He is also credited (as by Alex Ross in The New Yorker) with coining the phrase “post-classical music” to describe an emerging 21st-century musical landscape merging classical music with popular and non-Western genres.

Dvorak's Prophecy and the Vexed Fate of Black Classical Music (2022; winner of an ASCAP-Deems Taylor Award) "proposes a new paradigm" for the history of American classical music, replacing the standard narrative" popularized by Aaron Copland and Virgil Thomson; it privileges Ives, Gershwin, and Black classical music.

In 2002, Horowitz co-created PostClassical Ensemble, a chamber orchestra in Washington, D.C., for which he served as executive director, then executive producer through 2022. For Naxos, he produced nine PCE CDs, and DVDs featuring little-known American works. He also directed Music Unwound, a national consortium of orchestras and universities funded by the National Endowment for the Humanities. During the pandemic, he produced six “Dvorak’s Prophecy” Naxos documentary films. This led to his current series of “More than Music” documentaries for National Public Radio, broadcast via the news magazine 1A. His forthcoming books are The Marriage: The Mahlers in New York (his first novel) and The Propaganda of Freedom: JFK, Shostakovich, Stravinsky and the Cultural Cold War. He is also increasingly active as a vocal accompanist.

As a composer, Horowitz co-created (with the music historian Michael Beckerman) a widely performed Hiawatha Melodrama for narrator and orchestra incorporating a text by Longfellow. His Mahlerei, a concertino for bass trombone and chamber ensemble, adapts the Scherzo from Mahler’s Fourth Symphony. He is collaborating with the choreographer Igal Perry on a forthcoming Mahler/Schubert adaptation titled Einsamkeit.

As a concert producer, Horowitz began as artistic advisor to the Schubertiade at New York’s 92nd Street Y, for which he created all-day Schubert symposia incorporating film, Lieder, and chamber music (1981–1994). During his tenure with the Brooklyn Philharmonic, the orchestra received the 1996 Morton Gould Award for Innovative Programming from the American Symphony Orchestra League, as well as five ASCAP/ASOL awards for Adventuresome Programming; according to Alex Ross in The New Yorker (November 1997), “When Joseph Horowitz became executive director, the Brooklyn Philharmonic more or less went off the grid of American orchestral culture. The subscription-series template – overture, concerto, symphony – has been thrown away. Programs have become miniature weekend festivals.”

Beginning in 1999, Horowitz has served as a free-lance artistic consultant; he has conceived more than five dozen thematic inter-disciplinary music festivals for a variety of orchestras and performing arts institutions. For the National Endowment of the Humanities, he administered "Music Unwound," which producing humanities-infused festivals linking orchestras with educational institutions.

Horowitz was a music critic for The New York Times from 1976 to 1980. From 1998 and 2011, he was a regular contributor to The Times Literary Supplement; he has also written for a variety of scholarly publications, including The New Grove Dictionary of Music and Musicians. He is the author of the articles on classical music for both The Oxford Encyclopedia of American History and The Encyclopedia of New York State. He is the recipient of fellowships from the Guggenheim Foundation in 2001,

Books
Conversations with Arrau (1982)
Understanding Toscanini: How He Became an American Culture-God and Helped Create a New Audience for Old Music (1987)
 The Ivory Trade: Music and the Business of Music at the Van Cliburn International Piano Competition (1990)
Wagner Nights: An American History (1994)
The Post-Classical Predicament: Essays on Music and Society (1995)
Dvořák in America: In Search of the New World (for young readers, 2003)
Classical Music in America: A History of Its Rise and Fall (2005)
Artists in Exile: How Refugees from War and Revolution Transformed the American Performing Arts
Moral Fire: Musical Portraits from America's Fin de Siècle (2012)
"On My Way": The Untold Story of Rouben Mamoulian, George Gershwin, and Porgy and Bess (2013)
 Dvorak's Prophecy: And the Vexed Fate of Black Classical Music (2021)
 The Marriage: The Mahlers in New York (a novel, April 2023) 
 The Propaganda of Freedom: JFK, Shostakovich, Stravinsky and the Cold War (October 2023)

References

External links
  and 
 "Unanswered Question", blog at artsjournal.com

American musicologists
American music critics
21st-century American historians
21st-century American male writers
Classical music critics
1948 births
Living people
Writers from New York City
Historians from New York (state)
American male non-fiction writers